Hylaeothemis is a genus of dragonflies in the family Libellulidae.

Species
The genus contains the following species:

References

Libellulidae
Anisoptera genera
Taxa named by Friedrich Ris
Taxonomy articles created by Polbot